George Peter John Criscuola (born December 20, 1945), better known by his stage name Peter Criss, is an American retired musician, best known as a co-founder, original drummer, and vocalist of the hard rock band Kiss. Criss established The Catman character for his Kiss persona. In 2014, he was inducted into the Rock and Roll Hall of Fame as a member of Kiss.

Early years 
Criss was born in Brooklyn, New York, to Loretta and Joseph Criscuola, who raised their five children (of whom Peter was the eldest) as Roman Catholics. Joseph Criscuola's family came from Scafati, Salerno, Italy. Criss grew up in the Williamsburg section of Brooklyn and was a childhood friend of Jerry Nolan, who would later find success as the drummer of the New York Dolls. He was an avid art student and a swing aficionado. While playing with bandleader Joey Greco, Criss ended up studying under his idol, Gene Krupa, at the Metropole Club in New York.

Music career

Chelsea 
Criss was involved with several bands throughout the mid-to-late 1960s. It was during this time that Criss joined Chelsea, who had a two-album deal with Decca Records; the group released a self-titled album in 1970. They never recorded a second album and in August 1971 became Lips (a trio consisting of Criss and his Chelsea bandmates Michael Benvenga and Stan Penridge). By the spring of 1972, Lips was just the duo of Criss and Penridge.

In 1973, Pete Shepley and Mike Brand recorded an unreleased album which included post-Chelsea Michael Benvenga, and pre-Kiss Peter Criss and Gene Simmons as session musicians. It was titled Captain Sanity.

Kiss 

After the demise of his band Lips, Criss placed an advertisement in the East Coast edition of Rolling Stone Magazine, which read:

The advertisement was answered by Paul Stanley and Gene Simmons, who were looking for new members for their band. Ace Frehley was added to the lineup in December 1972, and the band was named Kiss later that month. However, Simmons describes first meeting Criss in his book Kiss And Make-Up thus:

Simmons later in the chapter describes going to a small Italian Club in Brooklyn to meet the drummer: "The drummer started to sing, and this Wilson Pickett-style voice came out of him. Paul and I said 'That's it, that's our drummer.' His name was Peter Criscuola."

Kiss released their self-titled debut in February 1974. Throughout his Kiss career, Criss was the lead singer on several songs including "Black Diamond", "Hard Luck Woman", and their breakthrough hit "Beth".

Criss co-wrote the ballad "Beth", a Top 10 hit for Kiss on the U.S. Billboard Hot 100 chart, peaking at No. 7 in 1976. The song remains the highest-charting song for Kiss in the United States and it earned them a People's Choice Award for "Young People's Favorite New Song" in 1977, tied with "Disco Duck". The song was written before Criss had joined Kiss, while he was still a member of Chelsea. Criss came up with the melody for the song while on a train to New York City from New Jersey where the band practiced. He and Penridge wrote the song together.

A demo exists of the song from 1971.

Departure from Kiss 
On the 1979 release Dynasty, he played only on his own composition, "Dirty Livin, and did not play at all on Unmasked (1980). Anton Fig, who also played on Ace Frehley's 1978 solo album, was hired as session drummer for  Dynasty and Unmasked. The reasons why Criss was fired from Kiss were never known, although it was obvious that his relationship with his bandmates Gene Simmons and Paul Stanley was not good at the time.

Gene Simmons has said Criss was fired; Paul Stanley discussed Criss's departure in several interviews, including the commentary on Kissology 2. Ace Frehley in his 2011 book, No Regrets, also stated that Criss was fired during a band meeting in which Frehley, Simmons, Stanley and manager Bill Aucoin voted Criss out of the band. A spoken word CD released in 1999 titled 13 Classic Kiss Stories, features Bill Aucoin (Kiss's first manager) where he also discusses Criss being "let go". Criss, however, has maintained that he quit the band. The video for "Shandi" was shot in one day, and Criss was out of the band at that time; Stanley said of the shoot, "We shot a video for the song 'Shandi' after the decision to let Peter go had been confirmed. He came to the video shoot knowing it was the last time he would appear with KISS. At the end of the day, he took his makeup case with him and left. It wasn't tearful, but it was a big moment. Peter was leaving. We had fired him, and this was the last time we were going to see him in the band".

Criss officially left Kiss on May 18, 1980.  As a result, Kiss postponed the European tour until the end of August, thus giving the band enough time to find a replacement drummer, who they found in Brooklyn-born Eric Carr.

Solo career 
In March 1980, Criss began recording his second solo album, Out of Control.  Released later in the year, the album was a commercial failure, despite remaining a favorite with Criss fans. The follow-up album, 1982's Let Me Rock You, which contained one song written by Gene Simmons, was a similar failure. The album cover featured Criss without his Kiss makeup, but was not released in the U.S. at the time.

For the rest of the 1980s and early 1990s, Criss was involved with a number of bands, each usually lasting less than a year. One of them was The Keep, which featured ex-Kiss guitarist Mark St. John. Criss also played with Balls of Fire from the spring of 1986 to December 1986, with Jane Booke on lead vocals, Bob Raylove on bass and JP (John Pakalenka) on guitar, who currently plays for Buckner Funken Jazz in Denver, Colorado.  Balls of Fire played only seven shows before Criss left the band to enjoy his daughter Jenilee growing up. Another was the Criss Penridge Alliance, essentially Peter Criss and Stan Penridge with the 1970s jazz rock fusion band Montage (Mike Hutchens – guitar, Allen Woody – bass (Govt Mule, Allman Brothers Band), John Moss – drums and Tony Crow – keyboards) who rehearsed 39 songs including from the first 3 Peter Criss solo albums, and played around 10 shows in total.

While Kiss was promoting their upcoming release Crazy Nights, Criss appeared on the syndicated radio program Metal Shop and discussed his time in Kiss from a more positive perspective than before; he promoted the book he was writing at the time, an autobiography to be titled A Face without a Kiss. He also mentioned his dream of one day opening up his own recording studio and starting his own record label, to be called Catman Records.

In the early 1990s, Criss assembled a band named "Criss", which would feature future Queensrÿche guitarist Mike Stone. This band released the Criss EP in December 1993 and the Cat #1 album in August 1994. He performed his last solo show on June 17, 2017, in New York City at the Cutting Room.

Return to Kiss 
In 1995, Criss appeared at the official Kiss Konvention in Los Angeles that led to the Kiss live performance that was recorded for MTV Unplugged. In April 1996, Kiss held a press conference to announce a reunion tour with all four original members. The 1996–97 Alive/Worldwide Tour was an enormous success, and the reunited Kiss released a studio album, 1998's Psycho Circus.

Criss played drums on only one track on the album ("Into the Void", Ace Frehley's one lead vocal track), although Criss did have one lead vocal (a track called "I Finally Found My Way", written by guitarist/vocalist Paul Stanley and Bob Ezrin) and a co-vocal taking turns in the verses with the rest of the band for the song "You Wanted the Best".

Second and third departures 
Criss left over a contract dispute and was replaced by Eric Singer in 2001. He rejoined the band in late 2002 and appeared on the Kiss Symphony: Alive IV DVD and CD before departing from Kiss again in March 2004. The band had opted not to renew his contract following the Rocksimus Maximus Tour. He was once again replaced by Singer, who assumed the "Catman" persona. He said of Kiss performing with replacements for Ace Frehley and himself:

Christopher Dickinson 
In 1991, a man named Christopher Dickinson became an impostor of the real Peter Criss. Dickinson went on to do an interview with the tabloid Star magazine, impersonating Criss, stating that he was now a "homeless alcoholic panhandling for change". Phil Donahue had both men on his show where the real Criss confronted the impostor. Since 2004, he has kept his public appearances to a minimum. Criss now resides in Wall Township, New Jersey. He released a solo album, titled One for All, in July 2007 on Silvercat Records.

Personal life 
As of November 2008, Criss has been married three times: Lydia Di Leonardo (1970–79), former Playboy Playmate and Coppertone model Debra Jensen (1979–94) and Gigi Criss (since May 1998). Criss has a daughter, Jenilee, born in 1981.

Criss was diagnosed with breast cancer in 2008. While working out, he noticed a lump on his chest that prompted him to visit a doctor. He was successfully treated with a lumpectomy.

Criss released his autobiography, Makeup to Breakup: My Life In and Out of Kiss, co-written with author Larry Sloman, in late 2012. In 2017, Criss made the decision to retire from touring at the age of 71.

Acting roles 
In addition to playing himself in 1978's Kiss Meets the Phantom of the Park and 1999's Detroit Rock City, Criss has appeared on two television programs in minor roles. 

In 2002, he appeared in two episodes of the HBO prison drama Oz as inmate Martin Montgomery. He played the role of Mike in the motion picture about the JFK assassination, Frame of Mind. 

Criss played himself, as well as the cameo role of "Nice Cop", in "...Thirteen Years Later", the 1998 third-season Halloween episode of Millennium.

Discography 

Studio albums
Peter Criss (1978)
Out of Control (1980)
Let Me Rock You (1982)
Cat No. 1 (1994)
One for All (2007)

Chelsea 
Studio albums:
Chelsea (1970)

Kiss 
Studio albums:
Kiss (1974)
Hotter than Hell (1974)
Dressed to Kill (1975)
Destroyer (1976)
Rock and Roll Over (1976)
Love Gun (1977)
Dynasty (1979)
Psycho Circus (1998)

Live albums:
Alive! (1975)
Alive II (1977)
Kiss Unplugged (1996)
Kiss Symphony: Alive IV (2003)
Alive! The Millennium Concert (2006)

References

External links 

Official website
Interview with Peter Criss
Second interview with Peter Criss
Billboard.com article by Greg Prato

1945 births
Living people
American heavy metal drummers
American rock drummers
American jazz drummers
Musicians from Brooklyn
Kiss (band) members
American people of Italian descent
American Roman Catholics
Singers from New Jersey
Singers from New York City
People from Wall Township, New Jersey
American male singers
20th-century American drummers
American male drummers
Jazz musicians from New York (state)
People from Williamsburg, Brooklyn
American male jazz musicians
Musicians with fictional stage personas